WBET-FM (99.3 FM, "Super Hits 99.3") (formerly WMSH-FM and WSTR-FM) is a radio station located in Sturgis, Michigan.

Sources
Michiguide.com - WBET-FM History
True Oldies 99.3 MySpace page

References

External links

BET-FM
Radio stations established in 1983